Strmilov is a town in Jindřichův Hradec District in the South Bohemian Region of the Czech Republic. It has about 1,400 inhabitants.

Administrative parts
Villages of Česká Olešná, Leština, Malý Jeníkov and Palupín are administrative parts of Strmilov.

Geography

It lies on the border between the Javořice Highlands, where most of the built-up area is located, and the Křemešník Highlands. The town is situated along the Hamerský stream. The built-up area is surrounded by fields and forests with several small fish ponds.

Strmilov lies on the border of historical lands of Moravia and Bohemia; a confluence of two brooks near Strmilov is the westernmost point of Moravia.

History
The original settlement was probably established at the beginning of 13th century. The first written mention of Strmilov is from 1255. In 1294, it was already titled as a market village. In 1385, it is referred to as a market town.

In 1945, the German population was expelled according to the Beneš decrees.

Sights
The landmark of the town is the Church of Saint Giles. It was built in the Empire style in 1843–1849.

Twin towns – sister cities

Strmilov is twinned with:
 Trubschachen, Switzerland

References

External links

 

Cities and towns in the Czech Republic
Populated places in Jindřichův Hradec District